Benjamin Franklin Meyer (1927–1995) was a theologian and scholar of religion. Born in November 1927 in Chicago, Illinois, he studied with the Jesuits, his studies taking him to California, Strasbourg, Göttingen, and Rome, where he received his doctorate from the Pontifical Gregorian University in 1965. He taught briefly at Alma College and at the Graduate Theological Union in Berkeley before joining the faculty at McMaster University in 1969, where he taught in the religious studies department until 1992. Meyer's areas of specialization included the historical Jesus,  and the hermeneutics of Bernard Lonergan. He authored several important monographs over his 30-year career. He died on 28 December 1995 in Les Verrières, Switzerland.

Meyer's works deeply influenced major scholars, such as Bruce Chilton, N. T. Wright, John P. Meier and Ben Witherington III.

Works

Thesis

Books

Edited by

See also

 John Dominic Crossan

References

Citations

Works cited

External links
 

1927 births
1995 deaths
20th-century Canadian historians
Alma College faculty
20th-century Canadian Jesuits
Canadian male non-fiction writers
Canadian Roman Catholic theologians
Academic staff of McMaster University
New Testament scholars
Pontifical Gregorian University alumni
Roman Catholic writers